Peercoin, also known as Peer-to-Peer Coin, PP Coin, or PPC is a  cryptocurrency utilizing both proof-of-stake and proof-of-work systems.

History

Peercoin is based on an August 2012 paper which listed the authors as Scott Nadal and Sunny King. King, who also created Primecoin, is a pseudonym. Peercoin was the first implementation of a proof-of-stake–based cryptocurrency. 

The Peercoin source code is distributed under the MIT/X11 software license.

Economics

Peercoin uses both the proof-of-work and proof-of-stake algorithms. Both are used to spread the distribution of new coins. Up to 99% of all Peercoins is created with PoW. Proof-of-stake is used to secure the network: The chain with longest PoS coin age wins in case of a blockchain split-up.

A transaction fee prevents spam and is burned (instead of being collected by a miner), benefiting the overall network.

To recover from lost coins and to discourage hoarding, the currency supply targets growth at 1% per year in the long run.

References

External links
 
 

2012 software
Application layer protocols
Cryptocurrency projects
Currencies introduced in 2012
Computer-related introductions in 2012
Digital currencies
Private currencies
Currency symbols